John le Fucker was an Englishman mentioned in an administrative record of 1278, and who has attracted attention for his unusual surname. His name has been proposed as incorporating the earliest recorded instance of the English swear word fuck, but this interpretation has been challenged.

Recorded details
According to an entry in the Close Rolls of the chancery of Edward I for 26 April 1278, John le Fucker was imprisoned for a double murder but was seeking bail. As published in 1900 in summary calendar form, the entry reads:

Name
Le Fucker's unusual surname has attracted interest since it was highlighted by Carl Buck in his 1949 Dictionary of Selected Synonyms in the Principal Indo-European Languages. Buck suggested that the surname derived from the Middle English word Fike or Fyke meaning "to fidget" – in other words, "John the Fidgeter" or perhaps more colloquially, "John the Restless". Other philologists have questioned Le Fucker's existence as Buck did not cite his source, hindering their ability to check the validity of the name or the context in which it appears.

In 1990, John Ayto brought Le Fucker to wider public attention when he claimed in his Dictionary of Word Origins that the surname was the earliest recorded instance in English of the word fuck. Noting that fuck is not recorded in writing until about the start of the 16th century, Ayto suggested that Le Fucker's surname indicated that the word "was around before 1500 (perhaps not committed to paper because even then it was under a taboo)". However, David Wilton rejects this theory, commenting that there is "no guarantee that this is an instance of the word fuck". This was a well-known 13th-century surname recorded in a variety of forms, some of which were very close to "Fucker", including Foucher, Foucar, Fouchia, Fucher, Foker and Fuker. Wilton concludes that Le Fucker's surname was "just another spelling of Fulcher (soldier)".

Robert Reisner suggested in 1971 that "it was not uncommon in the Middle Ages to have a characterizing adjectival phrase attached to one's name, such as Charles the Simple, Louis the Pious, so why not John the Fucker, if that was his most salient quality?" Allen Walker Read rejects this connection; although it was certainly commonplace at the time for people to acquire surnames reflecting their occupations, skills, places of origin, characteristics and so on, he comments that he "cannot imagine people seriously giving this activity prominence, or any man seriously accepting the name". Read argues that the existence of the surname actually indicates that fuck could not have been in use at the time; if it had been, "the name John le Fucker would surely have been avoided".

See also
 Roger Fuckebythenavele

References

13th-century English people
English people convicted of murder
Year of birth unknown
Year of death unknown
Place of birth unknown
English murderers